Lieutenant General Derrick Mgwebi (born 1956) is a South African military commander, serving as Director of the Joint Operations Division.

Military career 
He served as Commander of the United Nations Operation in Burundi in 2004. He also served as General Officer Commanding, Mpumalanga Command, after which he was appointed General Officer Commanding South African Army Infantry Formation. Before taking over at Joint Operations he was the Chief of Human Resources for the SANDF.

He was Force Commander of the United Nations MONUSCO mission to the DRC from December 2015 to January 2018.

Awards and decorations 
 
 
 
 
 
 
 
 
 
 
 African Union Medal for Intervention in Burundi

Proficiency and Qualification badges

References

 

 

South African Army generals
United Nations military personnel
Living people
1956 births